Hydnora is a group of parasitic plants described as a genus in 1775. It is native to Africa, Madagascar, and the Arabian Peninsula. Hydnora pollinates through brood-site mimicry. This is a method of pollination in which the plant emits a smell that is attractive to insects, so that the plant can trap the insect and allow to take pollen so that it can pollinate other Hydnora.

Taxonomy
The following species are listed within the genus Hydnora:
 Hydnora abyssinica A.Br. - Oman, Yemen, Saudi Arabia; S + C + SE + E Africa from Eritrea + Sudan to Namibia + KwaZulu-Natal
 Hydnora africana Thunb. - Angola, Namibia, Cape Province
Hydnora arabica Bolin & Musselman - Oman & Yemen
 Hydnora esculenta Jum. & H.Perrier - Madagascar
 Hydnora sinandevu Beentje & Q.Luke - Kenya, Tanzania
 Hydnora triceps Drège & E.Mey. - Northern Cape Province, Namibia
 Hydnora visseri Bolin, E.Maass, & Musselman - Northern Cape Province, Namibia

Etymology
The genus name Hydnora derives from the ancient Greek , 'truffle', because of the somatic structure of this root parasite.

Genomics

One of the smallest plastid genomes among flowering plants has been found in the genus Hydnora. As compared to the chloroplast genome of its closest photosynthetic relatives, the plastome of Hydnora visseri shows extreme reduction in both size (ca. 27 kilo base pairs) and gene content (24 genes appear to be functional).

Ethnobotany
Other Hydnora species are known to be available in Southern African herbal markets in Mozambique and South Africa. In South Africa the Imbola yesiXhosa are reported to use a thin paste of the powdered Hydnora rhizome as a treatment for acne and other skin conditions. In Uganda, the Hydnora spp. are reported to be used as food (fruits) and medicine (rhizomes) for diarrhea, hypertension, and diabetes, though these claims have not been confirmed.

References

Piperales genera
Parasitic plants
Aristolochiaceae